The 2007 St Albans City and District Council election took place on 3 May 2007 to elect members of St Albans District Council in Hertfordshire, England. One third of the council was up for election and the Liberal Democrats lost overall control of the council to no overall control.

After the election, the composition of the council was:
Liberal Democrats 29
Conservative 19
Labour 8
Independent 2

Campaign
A total of 83 candidates from the Liberal Democrats, Conservatives, Labour and Green Party stood in the election. Each party contested every ward, apart from in London Colney where the Green candidate was disqualified due to an incorrect nomination. Each ward had one seat up for election apart from in Harpenden West where two seats were contested as a Conservative councillor stood down early due to illness. The other parties needed to gain 3 seats from the Liberal Democrats to remove them from power, with a 2-seat drop meaning the Liberal Democrats would depend on the mayor's casting vote to remain in power.

After the Conservatives won the most votes in the previous 2006 election they were hoping to make gains, with Harpenden East, Marshalswick South, Verulam and Wheathampstead seen as being possible gains. Meanwhile, the Liberal Democrats defended their record in running the council during the election. They called for St Albans to be Hertfordshire's "premier community" and pointed to the Audit Commission rating the council as one of the 10 most improving in the country.

6 sitting councillors stood down at the election including a former Conservative cabinet member Chris Whiteside and a former Labour mayor Malcolm MacMillan.

Election result
The Liberal Democrats lost their overall majority after losing 2 seats to the Conservatives, dropping to exactly half of the council with 29 councillors. The 2 Conservative gains from the Liberal Democrats came in Harpenden East and Redbourn wards to lift the party to 19 seats and the Conservatives received around 2,000 votes more than the Liberal Democrats. There was no change elsewhere on the council, with Labour staying on 8 seats, despite dropping to fourth place in several wards and there also remained 2 independent councillors. Overall turnout at the election was 43.6%.

Following the election the Liberal Democrats remained in control of the council after one of the independent councillors, Tony Swendell, abstained on the vote to decide the composition of the cabinet.

Ward results

References

2007
2007 English local elections
2000s in Hertfordshire